Dmitry Vladimirovich Malyshko (born 19 March 1987) is a Russian biathlete, who has been competing on the World Cup circuit since the 2011–12 season. He debuted at World Cup on 9 December 2011. He got his first podium in individual races on 12 February 2012.

Together with Anton Shipulin, Alexey Volkov and Evgeny Ustyugov he won the gold medal in the Men's Relay at the 2014 Winter Olympics, in Sochi, Russia.

Biathlon results
All results are sourced from the International Biathlon Union.

Olympic Games
1 medal (1 gold)

World Championships
1 medal (1 bronze)

*During Olympic seasons competitions are only held for those events not included in the Olympic program.
**The single mixed relay was added as an event in 2019.

Individual victories
2 victories (1 Sp, 1 Pu) 

*Results are from UIPMB and IBU races which include the Biathlon World Cup, Biathlon World Championships and the Winter Olympic Games.

References

External links

1987 births
Living people
Russian male biathletes
Biathletes at the 2014 Winter Olympics
Olympic biathletes of Russia
Biathlon World Championships medalists
Competitors stripped of Winter Olympics medals
People from Sosnovy Bor, Leningrad Oblast
Sportspeople from Leningrad Oblast
21st-century Russian people
20th-century Russian people